Mohammed Boakye Agyemang (born 2 January 1949) is a Ghanaian politician and a member of the first Parliament of the fourth Republic representing the Ejisu-Juabeng constituency in the Ashanti Region of Ghana. He represented the National Democratic Congress.

Early life and  education
Agyemang was born at Juaben in the Ashanti Region of Ghana. He attended Ofori Panin Secondary School where he obtained his GCE Ordinary Certificate, and the Presby Training College in Akropong, where was awarded his Teachers' Training Certificate.

Politics
Agyemang was elected into parliament on the ticket of the National Democratic Congress to represent the Ejisu-Juabeng Constituency (now split into the Ejisu Constituency and the Juaben Constituency) in the Ashanti Region of Ghana during the 1992 Ghanaian parliamentary election. During  the 1996 Ghanaian general election, he was defeated by Akwasi Osei-Adjei of the New Patriotic Party who polled 34,521 votes out of the total valid votes cast representing 63.20% against his (Mohammed Boakye Agyeman) 10,103 votes which represented 18.50% of the total valid votes cast. Kwasi Baidoo of the Convention People's Party polled 569 votes representing 1.00% of the total valid  votes cast, and Kwame Owusu Agyeman of the People's National Congress polled 428 votes representing 0.80% of the total valid votes cast.

Career
Agyeman is a teacher by profession and a former member of parliament for the Ejisu-Juabeng Constituency. He resigned from being the Ejisu-Juaben Municipal Chief Executive (MCE) in 2011.

Personal life
Agyeman is a Muslim (Islam).

References

Living people
1949 births
National Democratic Congress (Ghana) politicians
Ghanaian Muslims
Ghanaian educators
Ghanaian MPs 1993–1997
People from Ashanti Region
21st-century Ghanaian politicians